Oliver J. Gough (25 August 1935 – 22 April 2020) was an Irish hurler who played for a number of clubs, including Ferns St Aidan's, Rathnure and Thomastown. He played for the Wexford and Kilkenny senior hurling teams at various times between 1955 and 1963, during which time he usually lined out as a centre-forward. Gough was the last player to win All-Ireland Championships with two different teams.

Honours
Wexford
All-Ireland Senior Hurling Championship (2): 1955, 1956
Leinster Senior Hurling Championship (2): 1955, 1956
National Hurling League (2): 1955–56, 1957–58

Kilkenny
All-Ireland Senior Hurling Championship (1): 1963
Leinster Senior Hurling Championship (1): 1963

References

1935 births
2020 deaths
Hurling forwards
Ferns St Aidan's hurlers
Rathnure hurlers
Thomastown hurlers
Wexford inter-county hurlers
Kilkenny inter-county hurlers
All-Ireland Senior Hurling Championship winners